means "health" in both Irish and Scottish Gaelic. It is commonly used as a drinking toast in Ireland, Scotland and the Isle of Man. However, the toast is also increasingly being used in other countries within the whisky community.

Variations

 is the basic form in Irish. Variations of this toast include  "good health" in Irish ( being the lenited form of  "good").

There are other variations such as:

  "on your health!" with the response  "health at yourself!"
  "great health" which is also used as a Jacobite toast with the alternative meaning of "health to Marion", Marion being a Jacobite code name for Prince Charles Edward Stuart.

Alternatively,  "healthy body" is also used in Manx.

Etymology
The word is an abstract noun derived from the Old Irish adjective  "whole, healthy" plus the Old Irish suffix , resulting in  "health" and eventually Middle Irish . The root  is derived from the Indo-European root *slā- "advantageous" and linked to words like German  "blessed" and the Latin  "health".

See also
 List of brief toasts worldwide

References

Irish words and phrases
Scottish Gaelic language
Drinking culture
Etiquette